Svartsö is an island located in the Stockholm archipelago in Värmdö Municipality in Sweden. In the summer the island is a popular destination for visitors. The landscape is relatively flat and there are several small lakes located on the island.

References

External links 

 Värmdö Norra Skärgårds Hembygdsförening 

Islands of the Stockholm archipelago